Kerry Kersh (née Harvick) (born September 10, 1974) is an American country music artist. Kersh starred on the first season of the Oxygen Network show The Bad Girls Club.

Music career
At age 19, Kersh performed on a local radio show, where she was discovered by Don Light, who signed her to a publishing contract with Cal IV Entertainment. Her first cut as a songwriter was "'Til Nothing Comes Between Us", a top-20 hit for John Michael Montgomery in 2002. Kersh signed to Lyric Street Records in 2004, working with producer Byron Gallimore. She was once married to singer Daryle Singletary, a native of Georgia, and she thereafter dated former country singer David Kersh, who appeared as a guest on several episodes of The Bad Girls Club.

On May 23, 2009, in Comanche, Texas, She married David Kersh married. They had a child and still maintain their residence in Comanche.

Kersh released one single, "Cowgirls", which was co-written by former Arista Nashville artist Ryan Tyler along with Angelo Petraglia and Hillary Lindsey. Although the song entered the Billboard country charts and peaked at number 45, Kersh's album was not released, and she was dropped from the label. She also posed in the March 2005 issue of FHM magazine along with fellow country singers Jennifer Hanson, Lauren Lucas, Catherine Britt, Shelly Fairchild, Jessi Alexander, Jamie O'Neal, and Tift Merritt.

Reality television

The Bad Girls Club
Kersh (as Kerry Harvick) starred in the first season of the reality series The Bad Girls Club. She made it through the whole season. Her husband, then boyfriend, David Kersh appeared in an episode as moral support after Kersh got into a fight with fellow BGC cast member Ripsi Terzian. During the episode, Kersh complained that she would not marry him; however, the two were married years later, in 2009.

Discography

Singles

Music videos

References

American country singer-songwriters
Living people
Singer-songwriters from Texas
American women country singers
Lyric Street Records artists
1974 births
People from Comanche, Texas
21st-century American singers
21st-century American women singers
Country musicians from Texas
Participants in American reality television series